Walter Muir Kelly (15 April 1929 – 16 February 1993) was a Scottish footballer who played as a centre forward in the Football League for Bury, Doncaster Rovers, Stockport County and Chester, and for Raith Rovers in the Scottish Football League.

His elder brother Willie Kelly was also a professional footballer; their father and two more brothers played at a lower level in Fife.

References

1929 births
1993 deaths
People from Cowdenbeath
Footballers from Fife
Association football forwards
Scottish footballers
Raith Rovers F.C. players
Scottish Football League players
Bury F.C. players
Doncaster Rovers F.C. players
Stockport County F.C. players
Chester City F.C. players
Hyde United F.C. players
English Football League players
Hill of Beath Hawthorn F.C. players
Scottish Junior Football Association players